Freedom of religion in Brazil is a constitutionally protected right, allowing believers the freedom to assemble and worship without limitation or interference. Non-traditional religions are well tolerated in the Brazilian culture.

Population profile

 Roman Catholic Christians - 64.6%
 Evangelicals - 22.2%
 Irreligious - 8%
 Spiritism - 2%
 Other religions - 3.2%

References

Religion in Brazil
Brazil
Human rights in Brazil